Erie County Airport  is a privately owned, public use airport in Erie County, Pennsylvania, United States. It is located three nautical miles (6 km) northwest of the central business district of Wattsburg, Pennsylvania. It is currently listed as abandoned on the Detroit sectional chart.

Facilities and aircraft 
Erie County Airport covers an area of 361 acres (146 ha) at an elevation of 1,494 feet (455 m) above mean sea level. It has one runway designated 9/27 with an asphalt surface measuring 3,030 by 60 feet (924 x 18 m).

References

External links 
 Erie County Airport (3G1) at PennDOT Bureau of Aviation
 Aerial image as of April 1994 from USGS The National Map

Defunct airports in Pennsylvania
Transportation buildings and structures in Erie County, Pennsylvania